Takeharu (written: 武春, 武治 or 丈晴) is a masculine Japanese given name. Notable people with the name include:

, Japanese sumo wrestler
, Japanese video game composer
, Japanese baseball player
, Japanese musician

Japanese masculine given names